Sanjay Khan (born Shah Abbas Ali Khan Tanoli, 3 January 1941) is an Indian actor, producer, and director known for his works in Hindi films and television. Sanjay Khan made his debut in Chetan Anand's 1964 film Haqeeqat, followed by the Rajshri film Dosti which won the National Film Award for Best Feature Film in Hindi for that year.

Khan starred in hit movies like Dus Lakh (1966), Ek Phool Do Mali (1969), Intaquam (1969),  Dhund (1973), Mela (1971) etc. He co-starred with his elder brother Feroz Khan in the films Upaasna (1971), Mela (1971) and Nagin (1976). He later turned producer and director with Chandi Sona (1977) and Abdullah (1980). In 1990, he starred in and directed the famous historical fiction television series The Sword of Tipu Sultan.

Early life
Sanjay Khan was born on 3 January 1941 as Shah Abbas Ali Khan Tanoli in Bangalore, Kingdom of Mysore, British India (now in Karnataka, India) into a Muslim family. Son of an immigrant Afghan Pashtun father of the Tanoli tribe, Sadiq Ali Khan Tanoli from Ghazni and an immigrant Persian mother, Bibi Fatima Begum from Iran, with five brothers and two sisters, Dilshad and Khurshid. His elder brother is Feroz Khan, who was a successful actor and also produced super hit movies like Dharmatma and Qurbani. His younger brothers Sameer and Shahrukh are businessmen, while Akbar Khan has made magnum opus Taj Mahal: An Eternal Love Story.

At the age of 12, Khan was taken to a theatre to see Raj Kapoor's Awaara and was mesmerised by the film. Following the film, he decided to visit with the actors. The manager of the theatre took Khan into the projection room and explained to him how the film is made. To Khan, that was a moment of epiphany and he decided to pursue an acting career. He obtained Senior Cambridge through Cambridge School in Daryaganj, New Delhi.

Deciding not to pursue further education, Khan moved to Mumbai where, before joining Bollywood, he assisted John Guillermin, Hollywood film director for the MGM Production of Tarzan Goes to India (1962).

Career

Khan made his debut in Chetan Anand's 1964 war film Haqeeqat in a small role as a soldier. Later that year, he played a pivotal supporting role in the big blockbuster film Dosti. He went on to star in hit films like Dus Lakh (1966), Ek Phool Do Mali (1969), Intaqam (1969), Shart (1969), Mela (1971), Upaasna (1971), Dhund (1973) and Nagin (1976). In 1977, he made his directorial debut with Chandi Sona starring himself, Parveen Babi and Raj Kapoor. In 1980, he directed and starred in Abdullah alongside Raj Kapoor and Zeenat Aman. He made his last film appearance in the 1986 film Kala Dhanda Goray Log, which was his third and last film as a director.

He shifted his focus on television in the late 1980s, directing and starring in the big-budget historical television drama series The Sword of Tipu Sultan. During the making of the series in 1989, a fire broke out on the sets and killed more than 40 crew members and Khan suffered 65% burns to his body. He recovered after 72 surgeries and production on the series resumed later that year with him and his brother Akbar Khan jointly directing episodes of the series. The series first aired on DD National from 1990 to 1991 and lasted 60 episodes. This would have been his final acting role but he went on to produce and direct several other popular television series like The Great Maratha, Jai Hanuman and 1857 Kranti.

Awards
 Uttar Pradesh Film journalists Association Award (1981)
 Andhra Pradesh journalist award (1986)
 The Gem of India Award for Excellence (1993)
 The Rajiv Gandhi Excellence Award (1993)
 The Udyog Ratna Gold Medal Award (1994)
 The Aashirwad Award (1994).
 The Arch of Excellence Award (1994)
 National Citizen's Award (1994)
 The Glory of India Award (1995)
 The Super Achiever of India Award (1995)
 Hind Gaurav Award (1997)
 Kashi Pandit Sansad Award (1997)
 Business Initiation Development Award (1997)
 Honour of Lifetime Achiever Award (1997)
 Achiever of Millennium Award (1999)
 The Millennium Achievers (2000)
 American Federation of Muslims of Indian Origin (2006)
 The Lifetime Achievement Award by Screen Star (2009)
 Biographer of the year award from Power Brands at BFJA (Bollywood Film Journalist's Awards) (2019)

Resort
In 1997, he launched his dream project – the five-star deluxe Golden Palms Hotel and Spa in Bangalore. He completed this 150-room hotel with built up area of approximately 300,000 sq ft, with the largest swimming pool ever built in India containing 300,000 litres of water. Golden Palms Hotel and Spa was conceived, designed, constructed was owned by him till 2010; his wife Zarine Khan designed the interiors.

Personal life
He is married to Zarine Khan, they have three daughters and a son, elder daughter Farah Khan Ali married to DJ Aqeel, now divorced, second daughter Simone Arora married to Ajay Arora they own D'decor, his youngest daughter Sussanne Khan (formerly married to actor Hrithik Roshan) and son an actor Zayed Khan married to Malaika.

Marriage to Zeenat Aman
Sanjay Khan was briefly married to Zeenat Aman, the marriage took place on 30 December 1978 in a private ceremony with two witnesses in Jaisalmer, Rajasthan. The relationship lasted less than a year, being annulled on 24 November 1979. The relationship was a difficult one for Zeenat Aman, having suffered domestic abuse including being beaten by Khan in the presence of various guests. It is also believed that the abuse she had to undergo resulted in permanent damage to her right eye.

Fire accident
A major fire accident took place on 8 February 1989 in the Premier Studios of Mysore where the serial The Sword of Tipu Sultan was being shot. Loose wiring and the absence of ventilators were further causes for the fire to spread. Instead of fire-proofing material, the walls had gunny bags and the temperature rose to around 120 °C (248 °F) because of huge lights being used. All these factors contributed to the massive fire, and the final death toll was 52. Khan suffered major burns and had to spend 13 months in hospital and undergo 73 surgeries.

Books launched

Autobiography
In 2018, he announced that he signed a deal with Penguin Books to release his autobiography titled The Best Mistakes of My Life and same year announced that he will build a theme park in Agra.

Assalamualaikum Watan
In 2020, he launched his second and last book "Assalamualaikum Watan".

Filmography

Actor

Television

Director
 Maharathi Karna (2003) TV series
 1857 Kranti (2002–2003) TV series
 Jai Mahabharat (2001–2002) TV series
 Jai Hanuman (1997–2000) TV series
 The Great Maratha (1994) TV series
 The Sword of Tipu Sultan (1990–1991) TV series
 Kala Dhanda Goray Log (1986)
 Abdullah (1980)
 Chandi Sona (1977)

Producer
 Maharathi Karna (2003) TV series
 1857 Kranti (2002–2003) TV series
 Jai Mahabharat (2001–2002) TV Series
 Jai Hanuman (1997–2000) TV series
 The Great Maratha (1994) TV series
 The Sword of Tipu Sultan (1990–1991) TV series
 Kala Dhanda Goray Log (1986)
 Abdullah (1980)
 Chandi Sona (1977)

Scripting
 Maharathi Karna (2003) TV series
 1857 Kranti (2002–2003) TV series
 Jai Mahabharat (2001–2002) TV series
 Jai Hanuman (1997–2000) TV series
 The Great Maratha (1994) TV series
 The Sword of Tipu Sultan (1990–1991) TV series
 Kala Dhanda Goray Log (1986)
 Abdullah (1980)
 Chandi Sona (1977)

References

External links

 
 

1941 births
Living people
Pashtun people
Indian people of Afghan descent
Indian people of Pashtun descent
Indian people of Iranian descent
Male actors from Bangalore
Indian male film actors
Indian male television actors
Film producers from Bangalore
Male actors in Hindi cinema
Hindi-language film directors
20th-century Indian film directors
20th-century Indian male actors
Hindi film producers
Film directors from Bangalore
Male actors in Hindi television
21st-century Indian film directors
21st-century Indian male actors